Sinnickson may refer to:

People:
Clement Hall Sinnickson (1834–1919), American Republican Party politician
Thomas Sinnickson (jurist) (1786–1873), American jurist and statesman from Salem, New Jersey
Thomas Sinnickson (merchant) (1744–1817), American merchant and statesman from Salem, New Jersey

Geography:
Sinnickson, Virginia, unincorporated community in Accomack County, Virginia